Tsing Lun Road (Chinese: 青麟路) is a road in Northwest Tuen Mun District, New Territories, Hong Kong. It connects Lam Tei Interchange on one end and Tsun Wen Road on the other.

See also
 List of streets and roads in Hong Kong

References

External links

Roads in the New Territories
Tuen Mun